A quasi-state (some times referred to as state-like entity or proto-state) is a political entity that does not represent a fully institutionalised or autonomous sovereign state.

The precise definition of quasi-state in political literature fluctuates depending on the context in which it is used. It has been used by some modern scholars to describe the self-governing British colonies and dependencies that exercised a form of home rule but remained crucial parts of the British Empire and subject firstly to the metropole's administration. Similarly, the Republics of the Soviet Union, which represented administrative units with their own respective national distinctions, have also been described as quasi-states.

In the 21st century usage, the term quasi-state has most often been evoked in reference to militant secessionist groups who claim, and exercise some form of territorial control over, a specific region, but which lack institutional cohesion. Such quasi-states include the Republika Srpska and Herzeg-Bosnia during the Bosnian War and Azawad during the 2012 Tuareg rebellion. The Islamic State is also widely held to be an example of a modern quasi-state or proto-state.
Types of countries

History

The term "proto-state" has been used in reference to contexts as far back as Ancient Greece, to refer to the phenomenon that the formation of a large and cohesive nation would often be preceded by very small and loose forms of statehood. For instance, historical sociologist Garry Runciman describes the evolution of social organisation in the Greek Dark Ages from statelessness, to what he calls semistates based on patriarchal domination but lacking inherent potential to achieve the requirements for statehood, sometimes transitioning into protostates with governmental roles able to maintain themselves generationally, which could evolve into larger and more centralised entities fulfilling the requirements of statehood by 700 BC in the archaic period.

Most ancient proto-states were the product of tribal societies, consisting of relatively short-lived confederations of communities that united under a single warlord or chieftain endowed with symbolic authority and military rank. These were not considered sovereign states since they rarely achieved any degree of institutional permanence and authority was often exercised over a mobile people rather than measurable territory. Loose confederacies of this nature were the primary means of embracing a common statehood by people in many regions, such as the Central Asian steppes, throughout ancient history.

Proto-states proliferated in Western Europe during the Middle Ages, likely as a result of a trend towards political decentralisation following the collapse of the Western Roman Empire and the adoption of feudalism. While theoretically owing allegiance to a single monarch under the feudal system, many lesser nobles administered their own fiefs as miniature "states within states" that were independent of each other. This practice was especially notable with regards to large, decentralised political entities such as the Holy Roman Empire, that incorporated many autonomous and semi-autonomous proto-states.

Following the Age of Discovery, the emergence of European colonialism resulted in the formation of colonial proto-states in Asia, Africa, and the Americas. A few colonies were given the unique status of protectorates, which were effectively controlled by the metropole but retained limited ability to administer themselves, self-governing colonies, dominions, and dependencies. These were distinct administrative units that each fulfilled many of the functions of a state without actually exercising full sovereignty or independence. Colonies without a sub-national home rule status, on the other hand, were considered administrative extensions of the colonising power rather than true proto-states. Colonial proto-states later served as the basis for a number of modern nation states, particularly on the Asian and African continents.

During the twentieth century, some proto-states existed as not only distinct administrative units, but their own theoretically self-governing republics joined to each other in a political union such as the socialist federal systems observed in Yugoslavia, Czechoslovakia, and the Soviet Union. 

Another form of proto-state that has become especially common since the end of World War II is established through the unconstitutional seizure of territory by an insurgent or militant group that proceeds to assume the role of a de facto government. Although denied recognition and bereft of civil institutions, insurgent proto-states may engage in external trade, provide social services, and even undertake limited diplomatic activity. These proto-states are usually formed by movements drawn from geographically concentrated ethnic or religious minorities, and are thus a common feature of inter-ethnic civil conflicts. This is often due to the inclinations of an internal cultural identity group seeking to reject the legitimacy of a sovereign state's political order, and create its own enclave where it is free to live under its own sphere of laws, social mores, and ordering. Since the 1980s a special kind of insurgent statehood has emerged in form of the "Jihadi proto-state", as the Islamist concept of statehood is extremely flexible. For instance, a Jihadi emirate can be simply understood as a territory or group ruled by an emir; accordingly, it might rule a significant area or just a neighborhood. Regardless of its extent, the assumption of statehood provides Jihadi militants with important internal legitimacy and cementes their self-identification as frontline society opposed to certain enemies.

The accumulation of territory by an insurgent force to form a sub-national geopolitical system and eventually, a proto-state, was a calculated process in China during the Chinese Civil War that set a precedent for many similar attempts throughout the twentieth and twenty-first centuries. Proto-states established as a result of civil conflict typically exist in a perpetual state of warfare and their wealth and populations may be limited accordingly. One of the most prominent examples of a wartime proto-state in the twenty-first century is the Islamic State of Iraq and the Levant, that maintained its own administrative bureaucracy and imposed taxes.

Theoretical basis

The definition of a proto-state is not concise, and has been confused by the interchangeable use of the terms state, country, and nation to describe a given territory. The term proto-state is preferred to "proto-nation" in an academic context, however, since some authorities also use nation to denote a social, ethnic, or cultural group capable of forming its own state.

A proto-state does not meet the four essential criteria for statehood as elaborated upon in the declarative theory of statehood of the 1933 Montevideo Convention: a permanent population, a defined territory, a government with its own institutions, and the capacity to enter into relations with other states. A proto-state is not necessarily synonymous with a state with limited recognition that otherwise has all the hallmarks of a fully functioning sovereign state, such as Rhodesia or the Republic of China, also known as Taiwan. However, proto-states frequently go unrecognised since a state actor that recognises a proto-state does so in violation of another state actor's external sovereignty. If full diplomatic recognition is extended to a proto-state and embassies exchanged, it is defined as a sovereign state in its own right and may no longer be classified as a proto-state.

Throughout modern history, partially autonomous regions of larger recognised states, especially those based on a historical precedent or ethnic and cultural distinctiveness that places them apart from those who dominate the state as a whole, have been considered proto-states. Home rule generates a sub-national institutional structure that may justifiably be defined as a proto-state. When a rebellion or insurrection seizes control and begins to establish some semblance of administration in regions within national territories under its effective rule, it has also metamorphosed into a proto-state. These wartime proto-states, sometimes known as insurgent states, may eventually transform the structure of a state altogether, or demarcate their own autonomous political spaces. While not a new phenomenon, the modern formation of a proto-states in territory held by a militant non-state entity was popularised by Mao Zedong during the Chinese Civil War, and the national liberation movements worldwide that adopted his military philosophies. The rise of an insurgent proto-state was sometimes also an indirect consequence of a movement adopting Che Guevara's foco theory of guerrilla warfare.

Secessionist proto-states are likeliest to form in preexisting states that lack secure boundaries, a concise and well-defined body of citizens, or a single sovereign power with a monopoly on the legitimate use of military force. They may be created as a result of putsches, insurrections, separatist political campaigns, foreign intervention, sectarian violence, civil war, and even the bloodless dissolution or division of the state.

Proto-states can be important regional players, as their existence impacts the options available to state actors, either as potential allies or as impediments to their political or economic policy articulations.

List of proto-states

Constituent proto-states

Current

Former

Secessionist, insurgent, and self-proclaimed autonomous proto-states

Current

Former

See also 
 Aspirant state
 Deep state
 Failed state
 List of countries and inhabited areas
 List of sovereign states
 Nation-building
 Rump state
 Sovereign state
 State-building

Notes and references

Annotations

References

Bibliography 

International law
Political science terminology
Political geography
Political metaphors
Political neologisms
Former countries
Former countries by form of government
Types of countries
Political anthropology